Emma Norton, a lawyer specialising in soldier's rights, is the head of legal case work at Liberty, an advocacy group. She has represented many female soldiers who have had their claims of sexual assault ignored or mishandled, as well as bereaved families of women in the armed forces. She sits on the Human Rights Committee of the Law Society.

Norton has published articles including "Neither efficient, effective, nor fair", a critical examination of the problems faced by members of the Armed Forces on issues of gender, religion, sexuality, and emotions. She represented the sisters of Cpl. Anne-Marie Ellement at the inquest into her death, where the coroner ruled that an alleged rape and bullying were factors in her suicide in October 2011, and called for the Ministry of Defence to review its care for vulnerable soldiers.

References

Year of birth missing (living people)
Living people
British solicitors